Geophysics is a bimonthly peer-reviewed scientific journal covering all aspects of research, exploration, and education in applied geophysics. It was established in 1936 and is published by the Society of Exploration Geophysicists. The current editor-in-chief is Jeffrey Shragge (Colorado School of Mines). According to the Journal Citation Reports, the journal has a 2018 impact factor of 2.793.

See also 
 List of scientific journals in earth and atmospheric sciences

References

External links 
 

Geophysics journals
English-language journals
Publications established in 1936
Academic journals published by learned and professional societies
Bimonthly journals